The 2015 Mid-Eastern Athletic Conference football season was the XXth season for MEAC Football, as part of the 2015 NCAA Division I FCS football season.

Previous season

22nd ranked Bethune-Cookman, along with North Carolina A&T, South Carolina State, North Carolina Central & Morgan State finished the season in a five-way tie for the MEAC Championship. Due to the MEAC's tiebreaker system, Morgan State earned the conference's automatic bid to the FCS Playoffs marking the Bears's first time in the FCS playoffs. Morgan State lost to Richmond in the First Round of the playoffs, eliminating the MEAC's lone representative in the postseason.

Head coaches
Terry Sims, Bethune-Cookman – 1st year
Kenny Carter, Delaware State– 1st year
Alex Wood, Florida A&M – 1st year
Connell Maynor, Hampton – 2nd year
Gary Harrell, Howard – 4th year
Lee Hull, Morgan State – 2nd year
Latrell Scott, Norfolk State – 2nd year
Rod Broadway, North Carolina A&T – 4th year
Jerry Mack, North Carolina Central – 2nd year
Earnest Wilson, Savannah State – 3rd year
Oliver Pough, South Carolina State – 14th year

Rankings

Regular season

All times Eastern time.

Rankings reflect that of the Sports Network poll for that week.

Week One

Players of the week:

Week Two

Players of the week:

Week Three

Players of the week:

Week Four

Players of the week:

Week Five

Players of the week:

Week Six

Players of the week:

Week Seven

Players of the week:

Week Eight

Players of the week:

Week Nine

Players of the week:

Week Ten

Players of the week:

Week Eleven

Players of the week:

Week Twelve

Players of the week:

Postseason
Since 1996, the MEAC earned an automatic bid into the Football Championship Subdivision playoffs. As of the 2015 season, the conference champion will abstain from participating in the playoffs and compete against the Southwestern Athletic Conference (SWAC) in the newly created Celebration Bowl. Any other team from the MEAC is able to participate in the playoff if they earn an at-large bid.

Bowl Games

Post Season Awards

As the MEAC regular season came to an end, the conference post season awards were announced. North Carolina A&T running back Tarik Cohen and South Carolina State's Javon Hargrave were named Conference Offensive and Defensive Players of the year, both of which received the top honors the previous season. Rounding out the postseason player selections were North Carolina Central’s Dorrel McClain, who earned Rookie of the Year, and North Carolina A&T’s Brandon Parker, was selected as the Offensive Lineman of the Year.

First-year head coach Terry Sims of Bethune-Cookman was selected as the MEAC Coach of the Year. Sims led the Wildcats to a share of the conference title, including a 9-2 overall finish and 7-1 mark in conference play. Highlights of the Wildcat's season include a victory over rival Florida A&M in their final game of the season which secured their stake in the conference title and entering the STATS FCS Top 25 poll in the final ranking of the season (25th) and reaching the FCS Coaches Poll with a 21st spot.

All Conference Teams
The following players were named to the MEAC All Conference Teams:

^ indicates that there was a tie in the voting

Records against other conferences

MEAC vs. FCS conferences

MEAC vs. FBS conferences

Attendance

Notes

References